Once a Sinner may refer to:
 Once a Sinner (1950 film), a British drama film
 Once a Sinner (1931 film), an American pre-Code romance film